Wingate is an English surname. Notable persons with that surname include:

 Anne Wingate (born 1943), American mystery writer 
 Catherine Wingate (1858–1946), British humanitarian
 Charly Wingate (born 1978), American hip hop rapper and criminal, known under the stage name Max B
 David Wingate (basketball) (born 1963), American basketball player 
 David Wingate (poet) (1828–1892), Scottish poet and miner 
 David B. Wingate (born 1935), Bermudian ornithologist
 David Robert Wingate (1819–1899), American businessman, farmer and soldier
 Dick Wingate (born 1952), American music industry and digital entertainment executive
 Edmund Wingate (1596–1656), English mathematical and legal writer
 Edward Wingate (1606–1685), English politician
 Elmer Wingate (born 1928), American football player (American football)
 George Wood Wingate (1840–1928), American lawyer, and rifle specialist
 Heath Wingate (born 1944), American football player
 Henry Travillion Wingate (born 1947), American federal judge
 James Lawton Wingate (1846–1924), Scottish painter
 Jason Wright Wingate (born 1971), American composer
 Joseph F. Wingate (1786–1845), American politician
 Josh Wingate, American actor
 Lisa Wingate (born 1965), American author
 Major Wingate (born 1983), American basketball player
 Orde Wingate (1903–1944), British army officer
 Paine Wingate (1739–1838), American preacher, farmer and statesman
 Poppy Wingate (1902-1977), British golfer, sister of Syd 
 Rachel O. Wingate (c. 1901–1953), English linguist and missionary 
 Reginald Wingate (1861–1953), British general and colonial administrator
 Robert Wingate (1832–1900), British civil engineer
 Ronald Wingate (1889-1978), British colonial administrator, soldier and author
 Stewart Wingate, British aviation executive
 Syd Wingate (1894-1953), British golfer, brother of Poppy

See also
 Wingate baronets
 Wingate (disambiguation)

References